The A4221 is an A road which links Banwen with Abercraf in Wales.

Route
The roads begins just south of Abercraf at the junction with the A4067.  It then heads eastwards through Caehopkin and then bypasses Coelbren.  It joins the A4109 just west of Banwen.

Roads in Wales
Transport in Neath Port Talbot
Transport in Powys